

About 
Userful Corporation is a Canadian multinational software company that is known for its visual networking platform for communication and collaboration across the enterprise. Userful’s platform enables users to deploy video walls, digital signs, and kiosks for uses including control rooms, corporate communication, dashboard walls, and customer experience centers. The company was founded in 2003 by Timothy Griffin and is now led by John Marshall, who was named CEO in 2018. Userful is headquartered in San Ramon, California and Calgary, Alberta, Canada, with additional locations in São Paulo, Brazil, and Dubai, United Arab Emirates. Userful is a privately held for-profit corporation with resellers around the world.

History

Founder and Chief Technology Officer Timothy Griffin founded Userful Corporation in 2003.

Userful released its initial software enabling desktop virtualization, which is used predominantly in settings that require secure desktop virtualizations, including the military, oilfields, and schools.

In 2012, Userful released v5 of its MultiSeat software, which added Ethernet zero client support. The same year, Userful, partnered with ViewSonic to produce a Linux-based zero-client product.

Userful launched its Userful Multiplatform 6, which enables running Windows, Linux, and browser desktops in a multiseat environment in 2013. Multipaltform 7.0 was launched in 2014.

Userful again partnered with ViewSonic in 2014 to create the SC-U25 Value VDI Client with Userful Multiplatform software. In late 2014, Userful launched Userful Network Video Wall software, which turns a standard PC into a video wall controller or video wall processor.

In 2015, Userful released v8 of the Userful Network Video Wall to improve performance. The company then released v8.5 in January 2016 to support 6K source content in real time, and the ability to support up to 40 screens from one standard PC and up to 60 screens from one high-end PC. 

In 2019, Userful launched its Visual Networking Platform, which can centrally manage all video and visual communications across an entire business. The company created three products for this platform: Userful Enterprise; Userful Cloud; and uClient.  

Userful Enterprise can push content to a variety of screens with tools such as content scheduling, remote desktop sharing and virtual keyboard-video-mouse interaction. Customers can use Userful Cloud to remotely manage content on the cloud from multiple locations.  

Userful built the uClient app as a replacement for media players, cables, extenders and other hardware components. It is available on LG's webOS signage platform and smart displays.  

In 2019, Userful opened offices in Dubai to strengthen the company’s presence in the fast-growing Middle East, Turkey, and Africa market.  

In 2022, LG Corporation and Userful announced a joint solution designed to make digital signage and other visual display applications feasible and more reliable over the local and wide area networks of enterprise-level corporate clients.

In April 2022, Userful secured CA$10 million in an all-equity investment. This investment follows a $3 million seed round in 2019, and a $950,000 federal loan in 2008 from the Canadian government as part of the Western Innovation Initiative. 

In July 2022, Userful named Dr. Mohammad Moshirpour, a professor at the University of Calgary’s Schulich School of Engineering as a strategic advisor to the company. Userful and the University of Calgary are working together to build a deeper knowledge of AV-over-IP technology by offering multimedia workshops. The new initiative teaches students the basics of the multimedia software framework GStreamer, API, and video streaming.

Products
Userful creates a centralized visual networking platform that enables teams to manage an enterprise's entire visual network. With the Userful platform, teams can deploy any source (high-resolution images and videos, live streams, web browsers, dashboards, CMSs, etc.) directly for display in control rooms, corporate communications, dashboard walls, interactive kiosks, data dashboards, and digital signage. 

Userful’s Emerald Signage is a content management system that enables users of the Userful visual networking platform to create, curate, and distribute digital signage content. Emerald Signage can be integrated into an enterprise’s network infrastructure, allowing IT departments to maintain administrative control, ensure data privacy, and network security, while giving each department content creation and management capability. 

Userful also has several enterprise applications that run on its AV-over-IP platform:

Diamond Decisions 
Provides an intuitive interface for operators to present, manage, and distribute content, information, and data in control rooms and operation centers.

Sapphire Spaces 
Enables users to leverage large format screens, video walls, and DV LED walls in meeting room spaces to create a collaborative canvas for meetings.

Emerald Plus 
Provides enhanced offerings of its Emerald Signage, expanding Userful’s existing digital signage capabilities.

See also
 Video Walls
 Video Wall Controller/Processor
 Network Video Walls
 Multiseat Computing
 Video Wall Software
 Touch Screens
 Public Computing
 Simple VDI
 Cloud management

References

Operating system distributions bootable from read-only media
Linux
Privately held companies of Canada